This is a list of the futsal competitions past and present for international teams and for club futsal, in individual countries and internationally.
The competitions are grouped by organizing authority: FIFA (international association), the six confederations (continental associations), the federations (national associations) and the AMF (international association).

FIFA (Intercontinental competitions)
This section lists the worldwide and intercontinental competitions ruled by the FIFA, by two or more confederations or by two or more federations member of different confederations.

National teams
FIFA Futsal World Cup
Futsal Confederations Cup

Clubs
Intercontinental Futsal Cup

Arab
National teams
Arab Futsal Championship

AFC (Asian competitions)
This section lists the competitions ruled by the Asian Football Confederation, or by federations member the Asian Football Confederation.
{| class="toc" summary="Contents" style="text-align:center;" width="100%"
|
| Afghanistan | Australia | Bahrain | Bangladesh | Bhutan | Brunei | Cambodia | China PR | Chinese Taipei | Guam | Hong Kong | India | Indonesia | Iran | Iraq | Japan | Jordan | Korea DPR | Korea Republic | Kuwait | Kyrgyzstan | Laos | Lebanon | Macau | Malaysia | Maldives | Mongolia | Myanmar | Nepal | Oman | Pakistan | Palestine | Philippines | Qatar | Saudi Arabia | Singapore | Sri Lanka | Syria | Tajikistan | Thailand | Timor-Leste | Turkmenistan | United Arab Emirates | Uzbekistan | Vietnam | <span style="color:red">Yemen|
|}

National teams

AFC Futsal Asian Cup
AFC Women's Futsal Asian Cup

Clubs
AFC Futsal Club Championship

Afghanistan

Australia

Bangladesh

Cambodia

China PR

Chinese Taipei

Hong Kong

India
 Top level league- Premier Futsal

Indonesia
 Top level league- Indonesia Pro Futsal League

Iran
 Top level league- Iranian Futsal Super League

Japan
 F.League : 1st/2nd-tier league
 JFA Japan Futsal Championship : National cup
 F.League Ocean Cup : League cup

Korea Republic

Lebanon

Malaysia

Myanmar

 Top level league- Myanmar Futsal League

Nepal

Pakistan

Singapore

  ESPZEN Futsal League
 D2D International Futsal League
 D2D Arena Futsal League
 D2D Futsal Cup （Cup）

Thailand 

Vietnam 

CAF (African competitions)
This section lists the competitions ruled by the Confederation of African Football, or by federations member the Confederation of African Football.

National teams
African Futsal Championship

Clubs

Algeria

Angola

Egypt

South Africa

CONCACAF (North American, Central American and Caribbean competitions)
This section lists the competitions ruled by the CONCACAF (Confederation of North, Central American and Caribbean Association Football), or by federations member the CONCACAF.

National teams
CONCACAF Futsal Championship

Clubs

Anguilla

Antigua and Barbuda

Aruba

Canada

Costa Rica

Jamaica

Mexico

U.S.A.
National League of Professional Futsal (NLPF) in partnership with U.S. Futsal
TBD promotion - Professional Futsal League

CONMEBOL (South American competitions)
This section lists the competitions ruled by the CONMEBOL (Confederación Sudamericana de Fútbol), or by federations member the CONMEBOL.

National teams
Copa América – FIFA Futsal (CONMEBOL)
Clubs
South American Club Futsal Championship

Argentina
 Top level league- Argentine Division de Honor de Futsal

Bolivia

Brazil
 Top level league- Liga Nacional de Futsal

Chile

Colombia

Ecuador

Paraguay

Peru

 Top level league - División de Honor de Fútbol Sala (Perú)

Uruguay

Venezuela

OFC (Oceanian competitions)
This section lists the competitions ruled by the Oceania Football Confederation, or by federations member the Oceania Football Confederation.

National teams
Oceanian Futsal Championship
Clubs

American Samoa

New Zealand

Solomon Islands
 Top level league- Telekom S-League

UEFA (European competitions)
This section lists the competitions ruled by the UEFA (Union of European Football Associations), or by federations member the UEFA.

National teams
UEFA Futsal Championship
UEFA Futsal Under-21 Championship
Clubs
UEFA Futsal Champions League

http://old.futsalplanet.com/agenda/agenda-01.asp?id=20744

European Universities Futsal Championships

Albania
 Albanian Futsal Championship
 Albanian Futsal Cup

Andorra
 1ª Divisió
 2ª Divisió
 Memorial Joan Canut I Bové (National Cup)
 Andorran Futsal Supercup

Armenia
 Armenian Championship
 Armenian Futsal Cup

Austria
 Murexin Futsal Bundesliga
 Austrian 2. Futsal Liga
 Austrian Futsal Cup
 Austrian Futsal Supercup
 Austrian Futsal League Cup

Azerbaijan
 Azerbaijan Premier League
 Azerbaijan Cup

Belarus
 Belarusian Futsal Premier League
 Belarusian Futsal Cup

Belgium
 Belgian Division 1
 Belgian Futsal Cup
 Belgian Futsal Supercup

Bosnia and Herzegovina
 Futsal Championship of Bosnia and Herzegovina
BIH Federation Futsal Premier League
Rebublic of Srpska Futsal Premier League
 Futsal Cup of Bosnia and Herzegovina

Bulgaria
 Bulgarian Premiere Futsal League
 Bulgarian Futsal Cup

Croatia
 Croatian 1.HMNL
 Croatian Futsal Cup

Cyprus
 Cypriot Futsal First Division
 Cypriot Futsal Second Division
 Cypriot Futsal Cup

Czech Republic

Denmark
 Top level league- Danish Futsal Championship

England
 Tier 1 - The FA National Futsal Series 1
 Tier 2 - The FA National Futsal Series 2 (North & South)
 Tier 3 - The National Futsal League
 FA Futsal Cup
 FA Women's Futsal Cup
 The FA National Futsal Series (Women)

Estonia

Faroe Islands

Finland

France
 Championnat de France de Futsal
 Coupe Nationale Futsal

Georgia

Germany
 DFB Futsal Cup (national cup)

Greece

Hungary

Iceland

Republic of Ireland
 Ireland Futsal Union Cup

Israel

Italy
 Serie A1 (Futsal)
 Serie A2 (Futsal)
 Serie B (Futsal)
 Serie C1 (Futsal)
 Serie C2 (Futsal)
 Serie D (Futsal)
 Coppa Italia (Futsal)
 Supercoppa Italia (Futsal)

Kazakhstan

Kosovo
 Superliga - Futsall（1st-tier league）
 Liga e parë - Futsall（2nd-tier league）

Latvia

 Liechtenstein 

 Lithuania 

 A Lyga
 Lithuanian Futsal Cup（Cup）

 Luxembourg 

 Macedonia 

 Malta 

 Moldova 

 Montenegro 

Netherlands
 Topdivisie

Northern Ireland

Norway

Poland

Portugal

Romania

 Russia 
 Russian Futsal Super League
 Russian Futsal Cup

San Marino

Scotland

Serbia

 Prva Futsal Liga

Slovakia

Slovenia

Spain
 División de Honor de Futsal
 División de Plata de Futsal
 Primera Nacional A de Futsal
 Primera Nacional B de Futsal
 Copa de España de Futsal
 Supercopa de España de Futsal

Sweden
 Swedish Futsal League
 Swedish Futsal Championship

Switzerland

Turkey

Ukraine

Wales

AMF (Intercontinental competitions)

This section lists the competitions ruled by the AMF. this list is incomplete''

National teams
 AMF Futsal World Cup
 AMF Women's World Futsal Championships

UEFS (European competitions)
This section lists the competitions ruled by the UEFS (Union European of Futsal), or by federations member the UEFS.

National teams
 UEFS Futsal Women's Championship

C.P.F.S. (Pan-American competitions)

C.S.F.S. (South American competitions)

References

External links
 FIFA official website
Futsalplanet.com - results from different countries.

 
Competitions